Gaston Chérau (6 November 1872 – 20 April 1937) was a French man of letters and journalist.

Biography 
The son of an industrialist, Gaston Chérau died in Boston during a lecture tour. A journalist and chronicler, he regularly gave the press his impressions of travel.

In 1911, he traveled through Tripolitania conquered by the Italians on behalf of Le Matin newspaper.

In 1914, he was a war reporter for the newspaper L'Illustration in Belgium and the North of France.

A fertile novelist of the province, his pen is very influenced by the Berry where he had family roots, stayed a part of his childhood, and where he returned assiduously on vacation in a second home until the end of his life.

He was elected a member of the Académie Goncourt in 1926.

He was also interested in cinema and wrote the dialogues of the film Les Deux mondes (1930) directed by Ewald Andreas Dupont.

Literary work 

He is the author of about forty novels.

1901: Les grandes époques de M. Thébault, Chamuel; Justin Clairbois remained in the state of manuscript
1921: Valentine Pacquault is at the same time his greatest success and his most famous work
 Sa destinée, novel
 Concorde !… 6 février 1934
1934: Le pays qui a perdu son âme, novel, Paris, Ferenczi
1930: Le Flambeau des Riffault, novel, Paris, Calmann-Lévy, Paris, Fasquelle
1929: Apprends-moi à être amoureuse, tales, Ferenczi
1930: La volupté du mal, novel, Ferenczi
1931: Les cercles du printemps, tales, Ferenczi
 La maison du quai, novel 
 L'enfant du pays, novel (Éd. L'Illustration, revue La Petite Illustration, four paperbacks: n° 561, 23 January 1932; n° 562, 30 January 1932; n° 563, 6 February 1932 ; n° 564, 13 February 1932 ; illustrations by 
 La voix de Werther, tales
1932: Celui du Bois Jacqueline, novel, Ferenczi
 Jacques Petitpont, novel for youth
 La saison balnéaire de M. Thebault, novel, Sevin et Rey
1903: Monseigneur voyage, novel, Paris, Ollendorf, Stock, 1910, Flammarion, 1920, 1921, 1927, 1930, 1948, 1967, then Ferenczi, 1931); The title character may have been inspired by Charles-Amable de La Tour d'Auvergne Lauraguais (1826–1879) archbishop of Bourges quoted at his death in a letter from Maurice Sand; The planned sequel, entitled L'Apprenti (1902?) was not published
1913: Le Monstre, tales, Stock, 1913
1906: Champi-Tortu, novel, Olendorff, 1906
1910: La prison de verre, sequel to Champi-Tortu, Calmann-Lévy
1913: , novel, Calmann-Lévy
1914: , sequel to L'Oiseau de proie, Plon
1929: Fra Camboulive, novel, Flammarion
1927: Valentine Pacquault, novel (Paris, Mornay - Les Beaux Livres, illustrations by Edelman)
1923: La Despélouquéro, tales, Plon
 La Maison de Patrice Perrier, novel
1926: Le vent du destin, tales, Plon
1927: L'égarée sur la route, novel, Ferenczi
 L'ombre du maître, novel
 L'enlèvement de la princesse, novel
1934: Chasses et plein air en France, short stories, Stock
1937: Séverin Dunastier, novel, Paris, Albin Michel

He wrote a number of works for children such as Jacques Petitpont, roi de Madagascar (J. Ferenczi, 1928, ill. d'Avelot), L'enlèvement de la princesse (Hachette, 1934, ill. André Pécoud ) or Contes et nouvelles de Gascogne (Bibliothèque Nelson illustrée, 1938, ill. Georges Dutriac).

Georges Bernanos described him as a "Maupassant of sub-prefecture", because he had not voted for the Voyage au bout de la nuit by Louis-Ferdinand Céline at the 1932 edition of the prix Goncourt (Le Figaro, 13 December 1932).

(Léon Daudet, L’Action française, 22 April 1937).

Sources 
 Hommage à Gaston Chérau à l'occasion du cinquantenaire de sa mort, in "Bulletin de la Société Historique et Scientifique des Deux-Sèvres", n°1109, tome XX, 1987
 Catalog of the exhibition Gaston Chérau, romancier de la province française, 1872-1937 at the municipal library of Niort, from 24 October 1987 to 15 December 1987, et à la bibliothèque de l'Arsenal, Paris, from 5 February 1988 to 9 April 1988, with bibliography
 Françoise Bertrand-Py, "Argenton et l'œuvre de G. Chérau", in Argenton et son histoire, n° 5, 1988, Cercle d'histoire d'Argenton, Argenton-sur-Creuse
 Madeleine Naud, "Sur les pas de Gaston Chérau", in Argenton et son histoire, n° 9, 1992, Cercle d'histoire d'Argenton, Argenton-sur-Creuse
  and Gérard Coulon, Argenton-sur-Creuse et ses écrivains, 135 p., p. 37-41, Paris, Royer, 1996 .
 Pierre Schill, Réveiller l’archive d’une guerre coloniale. Photographies et écrits de Gaston Chérau, correspondant de guerre lors du conflit italo-turc pour la Libye (1911-1912), Créaphis, 2018, 480p.et 230 photographies. A book about his two experiences as a war correspondent in Tripolitania and at the beginning of the First World War.

References

External links 
 Gaston Chérau on Babelio
 Gaston Chérau, Valentine Pacquault (1921) on Centre Flaubert
 Un romancier. Gaston Chéreau on Paris Sorbonne
 Le monstre, de Gaston Chérau on Pariscilaculture
 Gaston Chérau, "Le monstre" : un conteur de talent à redécouvrir on Linternaute
 Gaston Chérau reporter de guerre on La Nouvelle République (3 November 2014)

20th-century French journalists
20th-century French writers
1872 births
People from Niort
1937 deaths